A covering force is a military force tasked with operating in conjunction with a larger force, with the role of providing a strong protective outpost line (including operating in advance of the main force), searching for and attacking enemy forces or defending the main force from attack.

The United States Army field manual "FM 3-90.6 Brigade Combat Team" provides the following definition of the role of a covering force:

During World War II, the main body of the British Home Fleet regularly sortied into the Norwegian Sea to provide a heavy covering force to protect Arctic convoys from attack by German warships stationed in occupied Norway. The Battle of Driniumor River also provides an example of a covering force action.

References

Ad hoc units and formations
Force protection tactics
Maneuver tactics